Michelle N. Kidani (born September 30, 1948, in Honolulu, Hawaii) is an American politician and a Democratic member of the Hawaii Senate since January 16, 2013 representing District 18. Kidani served consecutively from 2009 until 2013 in the District 17 seat.

Education
Kidani earned her Associate degree as a legal secretary from Honolulu Business College, her AA in liberal arts from Leeward Community College, and her Bachelor of Science from unaccredited Kennedy-Western University (later Warren National University), a defunct higher education institution that was sued for fraudulent practices by former students and deemed a diploma mill by federal investigators. As of 2023, she is the vice-chair of the Hawaii Senate Higher Education Committee.

Elections
2012 Redistricted to District 18, and with Democratic Senator Clarence K. Nishihara redistricted to District 17, Kidani won the August 11, 2012 Democratic Primary with 7,434 votes (60.3%) against former Representative Michael Magaoay, and won the November 6, 2012 General election with 14,518 votes (67.3%) against Republican nominee Rojo Herrera.
2008 Kidani challenged incumbent Senator Ron Menor in the three-way September 20, 2008 Democratic Primary, winning with 3,890 votes (41.2%), and was unopposed for the November 4, 2008 General election.

References

External links
Official page at the Hawaii State Legislature

1948 births
Living people
21st-century American politicians
21st-century American women politicians
American women of Japanese descent in politics
Hawaii politicians of Japanese descent
Honolulu Business College alumni
Democratic Party Hawaii state senators
Leeward Community College alumni
Politicians from Honolulu
University of Hawaiʻi alumni
Women state legislators in Hawaii